Fizuli Mammadov (born 8 September 1977) is an Azerbaijani footballer playing as a defender.

National team statistics

External links
 
 Profile at footballzz.co.uk

1977 births
Living people
Azerbaijani footballers
Azerbaijani expatriate footballers
Simurq PIK players
Machine Sazi F.C. players
FC Spartak Ivano-Frankivsk players
Expatriate footballers in Iran
Expatriate footballers in Ukraine

Association football defenders
Azerbaijan international footballers